There are three main railway stations in Budapest:

Budapest Keleti pályaudvar (Budapest East railway station)
Budapest Nyugati pályaudvar (Budapest West railway station)
Budapest Déli pályaudvar (Budapest South railway station)